This is a list of members of the Australian House of Representatives from 1984 to 1987, as elected at the 1984 federal election. They were together known as the 34th Parliament.

 The Labor member for Scullin (VIC), Harry Jenkins Sr., resigned on 20 December 1985. His son, Harry Jenkins, won the resulting by-election.

References

Members of Australian parliaments by term
20th-century Australian politicians